Sam Kamara (born December 21, 1997) is an American football defensive end for the Cleveland Browns of the National Football League (NFL). Kamara played college football at Stony Brook.

Early life and high school 
Kamara was raised in Carteret, New Jersey. He attended Carteret High School, where he played on both sides of the ball, also scoring seven touchdowns as the team's fullback. Kamara earned first-team All-Conference honors as well as the Mini Max award, a New Jersey accolade based on performance, academic achievement and community service. His head coach compared him favorably to fellow Carteret standout Jason Worilds, a second-round draft pick from Virginia Tech in 2010.  Although Kamara earned FCS offers from colleges including Maine, Monmouth and Stony Brook, the only FBS school to show interest in him was Pittsburgh.

College career 
Kamara played in eight games in his freshman season in 2016, making three starts. His first career start came on October 29, 2016, against New Hampshire, where he became the first true freshman to start a game for Stony Brook in the season. In his sophomore season, Kamara started all thirteen games at defensive end, recording 31 tackles and a sack. 

Kamara led the team with nine sacks in his 2018 junior season, also recording 42 tackles with 11.5 for loss. He set a collegiate career high with seven tackles against Air Force, and also recorded six tackles and 2.5 sacks against Southeast Missouri State in the first round of the FCS playoffs. He was named second-team All-CAA after the season. Before his senior season, Kamara was named one of three team captains by head coach Chuck Priore and saw his name floated as a potential NFL draft pick, with NFLPA scouting director Dane Vandernat declaring that Kamara "possesses all the physical attributes that pro scouts require." However, he played only five games before suffering a shoulder injury and missing the rest of the season. Kamara was granted a waiver by the NCAA to return for a fifth year in 2020, but the season was postponed to the spring as a result of the COVID-19 pandemic. In the shortened spring season, Kamara recorded 12 tackles and two sacks in three games, earning first-team All-CAA honors as a defensive lineman.

College statistics

Professional career

Chicago Bears
Kamara signed with the Chicago Bears following the 2021 NFL Draft as an undrafted free agent. Designated as the fourth-string linebacker in the team's first depth chart, Kamara made his preseason debut on August 14, 2021 against the Miami Dolphins. He ended preseason with six tackles, three quarterback hits and a sack. He was waived on August 31, 2021 and re-signed to the practice squad the next day. Kamara was promoted to the active roster on October 12 due to a season ending injury to teammate Jeremiah Attaochu. 

Kamara made his NFL debut on October 17 against the Green Bay Packers and recorded his first tackle on Aaron Jones. He was waived by the team on November 3 and re-signed to the practice squad. He was flexed to the active roster ahead of the Bears' Monday Night Football game against the Pittsburgh Steelers and recorded two tackles in his first multi-tackle game. Kamara was flexed to the active roster for the Bears' Thanksgiving game against the Detroit Lions, where he was Chicago's third-highest graded defensive player before exiting the game with a concussion. Kamara was placed on the reserve/COVID-19 list on December 14. He was signed to the active roster on December 23. He recorded a career-high three tackles against the New York Giants on January 2. Kamara had his first tackle for loss and pass deflection on January 9 against the Minnesota Vikings. He ended his rookie season playing eight games, recording 10 tackles with one TFL and one pass deflection.

On August 30, 2022, Kamara was waived by the Bears and signed to the practice squad the next day. He was released on September 9.

Cleveland Browns
On October 4, 2022, Kamara was signed to the Cleveland Browns practice squad. He signed a reserve/future contract on January 9, 2023.

NFL career statistics

References

External links 
 Chicago Bears bio
 Stony Brook Seawolves bio

1997 births
Living people
American football defensive tackles
Carteret High School alumni
Stony Brook Seawolves football players
Chicago Bears players
Cleveland Browns players
Players of American football from New Jersey
People from Carteret, New Jersey
Sportspeople from Middlesex County, New Jersey